Sergio "Checho" Angulo (born 14 September 1960) is a Colombian football manager and former player, who played as a striker for the Colombia national football team and for Deportivo Cali. He has also played for Cúcuta Deportivo, Independiente Santa Fe, América de Cali, Deportivo Pereira, Deportivo Independiente Popayán, Deportivo Pasto, and Deportivo Unicosta. He is currently the manager of Deportivo Cali's women's team.

Club career
His football debut was on 19 April 1979. He retired in 1998.

International career
With the Colombia national football team, he participated in the 1979 South American U-20 Championship. Angulo did not score any goals in his nine appearances for the Colombian national team between 1987 and 1991. He participated in the 1987 and 1989 Copa Américas for Colombia. He was the top scorer of the Categoría Primera A in 1988 with 29 goals.

Personal life
His son is the soccer player Mario Sergio Angulo.

Coaching
He has coached mainly youth teams of Millonarios and Deportivo Cali, where he served as assistant coach of Iván Arroyo, Diego Umaña, Óscar Quintabani and Pedro Sarmiento. On 19 October 2017, he was appointed as caretaker manager of Deportivo Cali.

References

External links

1960 births
Living people
People from Ibagué
Colombian footballers
1987 Copa América players
1989 Copa América players
Deportivo Cali footballers
Cúcuta Deportivo footballers
Independiente Santa Fe footballers
América de Cali footballers
Deportivo Pereira footballers
Universitario Popayán footballers
Deportivo Pasto footballers
Categoría Primera A players
Association football forwards
Liga Panameña de Fútbol managers
Colombian football managers
Deportivo Cali managers
Cortuluá managers
Tauro F.C. managers
San Francisco F.C. managers
Colombia international footballers